Anselmo Sacasas (23 November 1912 – 22 January 1998) was a Cuban jazz pianist, bandleader, composer, and arranger. As a pianist he took inspiration from Cuban tres players like Arsenio Rodríguez, adapting their techniques to his own style as a soloist in orchestras playing Cuban music.

He began to learn piano at the age of 6 from a female cousin, and 10 years later graduated from the music conservatory in Manzanillo. He later moved to Havana, where he composed piano pieces for silent films and developed an interest in the danzón style. In the early 1930s he was a member of Tata Pereira's orchestra.

In 1936 he met the singer Miguelito Valdés, with whom he would work in the Orquesta de los Hermanos Castro. Shortly after he would found the Orquesta Casino de la Playa. This band, with its jazz arrangements, would prove to be a complete revolution in the Cuban music scene, touring Central and South America and appearing on film in both Cuba and the United States.

In 1940, Sacasas left for New York, where after some difficulty he was able to found his own orchestra in 1941. They played in the Colony Club in Chicago and the cabarets La Conga Club and Havana Madrid in Manhattan.

In 1959 he became the musical director of the hotel Fountainbleu in Miami and Club Ronde. In 1963 he became the director of the cabaret Tropicoro for thirteen years, after which he retired to Miami, where he died in 1998.

Discography 
In the Hall of the Mambo King (2002 CD)
1942-1944 (1996 CD)
Sol Tropical "1945-1949"
Anselmo Sacasas "1942-44" (Harlequin, 1996)
Anselmo Sacasas "Poco Loco: 1945-1949" (Tumbao, 1995)

References

Cuban jazz pianists
Big band pianists
Big band bandleaders
1912 births
1998 deaths
20th-century pianists
Orquesta Riverside members